CAE Douala (formerly Sabena Flight Academy Africa) (CAE SFA-A) is an aviation school owned by Canadian group CAE (part of its CAE Global Academy), located at Douala,  Cameroon. It was the first civil aviation university in the country.

Former subsidiary of Sabena Flight Academy, the school trains airline pilots, flight attendants (preparation of the Certificat de formation à la sécurité) and flight dispatchers.

History
The school was   created in 2008 by Joseph Barla,  and Jean-Yves Kotto, as subsidiary of  Sabena Flight Academy, a Belgian school created in 1953.  A few months later, following the absorption of Sabena Flight Academy by CAE, SFA-A   become  part of  CAE Global Academy, renamed CAE Global Academy Douala.

Equipments
On its Douala campus, the school has three flight simulators : one FNPT2 calibrated like a Boeing 737-800, a second FNPT2 showing the Diamond DA42 and a FNPT1 dedicated to instrument flight rules training.

References

External links
 Official website

Aviation schools
Douala
Educational institutions established in 2008
Universities in Cameroon
2008 establishments in Cameroon